Louis D. Astorino (born 1948) is an architect in Pittsburgh, Pennsylvania and the first American architect to design a building in the Vatican.

Biography
Astorino was born in Pittsburgh to a family of mixed Italian and Serbian origin. His Serbian cousins influenced Astorino's upbringing and career choice. He received a bachelor's degree from Penn State College of Arts and Architecture in 1969. In 1972, he started his own firm, L. D. Astorino & Associates. It was later named Astorino.

Astorino was introduced to the international stage in 1996 when Gateway Clipper Fleet founder John E. Connelly introduced him as a prospective architect for the Domus Sanctae Marthae that Pope John Paul II wanted to build to house cardinals during the selection of popes. Connelly was offering to finance the project. Astorino's design was rejected but he was kept on as supervisory architect. He later designed the adjoining Chapel of the Holy Spirit. Astorino's firm designed the new Children's Hospital of Pittsburgh, completed in 2009 at a cost of $622 million.

In December 2014, Astorino's firm was acquired by CannonDesign, which is based in Buffalo, New York.

Astorino, who has a brother Dennis, is of Serbian origin through his mother.

Projects
Domus Sanctae Marthae, Vatican (supervisory architect)
Chapel of the Holy Spirit, Vatican (architect of record)
Trimont condominium, Pittsburgh
Fallingwater, Mill Run, Pennsylvania (restoration)
PNC Park, Pittsburgh architect of record with HOK Sport
McKechnie Field, Bradenton, Florida (1993 renovation)
University of Pittsburgh Medical Center transplant center in Palermo, Italy
UPMC Children's Hospital of Pittsburgh, Pittsburgh
Three PNC Plaza
Fred Rogers Tribute to Children monument in Pittsburgh
Peoples Natural Gas Field
UPMC Sports Performance Complex

References

External links
Profile at astorino.com

1948 births
Architects from Pittsburgh
Penn State College of Arts and Architecture alumni
Living people
American people of Serbian descent